Ergasilidae is a widespread family of copepods and comprises many species. The type genus is Ergasilus. With a few doubtful exceptions all ergasilids are parasitic on fishes.

Biology
Various species of Ergasilidae parasitise hosts in various habitats, mostly freshwater, but some attack marine species, especially euryhaline fishes such as mullet. Because the best-known species are adapted to attack the gill filaments of the fishes, Ergasilidae are known by common names such as gill lice. However, some species have been found infesting, and presumably causing, external skin lesions of fish.

Immature instars and mature males of Ergasilidae are fairly typical free-living planktonic copepods. The mature females also can swim competently and at least one species, Ergasilus chautauquaensis, is not known to be parasitic at all. However, that is exceptional; most adult females are parasitic and have morphological adaptations for attacking the gills of host species of fishes.

Though their antennules retain their sensory function, the main second antennae of the adult females are adapted to clinging to the gill filaments of host fishes. In many Ergasilus species it is not clear that mature females are able to release their grip once attached, but when forcibly detached from the host's gills they swim without difficulty.

Another adaptation in parasitic females is that their first legs are armed with heavy, blade-like spines, and in some species the joints also are fused, stiffening them and increasing their effectiveness for harvesting host tissue. Once attached to the gills, the females use their first pair of legs to rasp off gill mucus and tissue and  move it forward towards the mouth.

In the genus Ergasilus only the adult females are parasitic. The planktonic males do not venture inside fishes, so fertilisation must take place before the females attach themselves to the host's gills.

Economic significance
Since the Ergasilus females attack the gills of fish, a heavy infestation can cause severe damage and secondary infections, interfere with respiration, and sometimes kill the host. In some fisheries and aquacultural enterprises the mortality and morbidity among fish stocks can present serious economic and ecological problems.

Genera
The family Ergasilidae contains the following genera:

Abergasilus Hewitt, 1978
Acusicola Cressey, 1970
Amplexibranchius Thatcher & Paredes, 1985
Anklobrachius Thatcher, 1999
Brasergasilus Thatcher & Boeger, 1983
Dermoergasilus Ho & Do, 1982
Ergasilus von Nordmann, 1832
Gamidactylus Thatcher & Boeger, 1984
Gamispatulus Thatcher & Boeger, 1984
Gamispinus Thatcher & Boeger, 1984
Gauchergasilus Montu & Boxshall, 2002
Majalincola Tang & Kalman, 2008
Miracetyma Malta, 1993
Mugilicola Tripathi, 1960
Neoergasilus Yin, 1956
Nipergasilus Yamaguti, 1939
Paeonodes C. B. Wilson, 1944
Paraergasilus Markevich, 1937
Pindapixara Malta, 1994
Prehendorastrus Boeger & Thatcher, 1990
Pseudovaigamus Amado, Ho & Rocha, 1995
Rhinergasilus Boeger & Thatcher, 1988
Sinergasilus Yin, 1949
Teredophilus Rancurel, 1954
Therodamas Krøyer, 1863
Thersitina Norman, 1905
Vaigamus Thatcher & Robertson, 1984

References

External links

Poecilostomatoida
Taxa named by Alexander von Nordmann
Crustacean families